The Shoolagiri block is a revenue block in the Krishnagiri district of Tamil Nadu, India. It has a total of 42 panchayat villages.

List of villages in Shoolagiri block:

Kamandoddi, Uddanapalli, Athimugam, Nallarallapalli, Thyagarasanapalli, Samanapalli, Etc.

References 
 

Beggili village, venkatesapuram post, Vepanapalli taluk, krishnagiri district.

Revenue blocks of Krishnagiri district